Frank Ramirez Zapata (born July 1, 1944) is a senior United States district judge of the United States District Court for the District of Arizona.

Early life and education
Born in Safford, Arizona, Zapata received an Associate of Arts degree from Eastern Arizona College in 1964, a Bachelor of Arts degree from the University of Arizona in 1966, and a Juris Doctor from the University of Arizona College of Law in 1973.

Career
Zapata was a Staff attorney of Pima County Legal Aid Society, Arizona from 1973 to 1974. He was an Assistant federal public defender, Arizona from 1974 to 1984. He was a Chief assistant federal public defender, Arizona from 1984 to 1994. He was an Assistant adjunct professor, University of Arizona College of Law from 1988 to 1990.

Federal judicial service

United States magistrate judge service 
Zapata served as a United States magistrate judge of the United States District Court for the District of Arizona from 1994 to 1996.

District court service 
Zapata was nominated by President Bill Clinton on March 29, 1996, to a seat vacated by Richard Mansfield Bilby. He was confirmed by the United States Senate on July 31, 1996, and received his commission on August 1, 1996. He took senior status on August 3, 2010.

Awards and recognition
In 2013, Judge Zapata received the Public Service Award from the University of Arizona Alumni Association

See also
List of Hispanic/Latino American jurists

References

Sources

1944 births
Living people
Eastern Arizona College alumni
Hispanic and Latino American judges
James E. Rogers College of Law alumni
Judges of the United States District Court for the District of Arizona
People from Safford, Arizona
Public defenders
United States district court judges appointed by Bill Clinton
United States magistrate judges
University of Arizona alumni
20th-century American judges
21st-century American judges